Jiggs and Maggie are the major characters in a series of films made by the American studio Monogram Pictures between 1946 and 1950. Jiggs and Maggie are Irish immigrants to the United States, who constantly argue. The characters were created by the cartoonist George McManus in his long-running strip Bringing Up Father. McManus appears in four of the films, playing himself.

The characters had first appeared on screen in the 1928 MGM film Bringing Up Father. In 1946 Monogram made a fresh version starring actors Joe Yule and Renie Riano. Due to the popularity of the film, a series of four sequels were made. Monogram was a low-budget studio that specializes in making comedy, crime and western series.

The final film in the series, Jiggs and Maggie Out West, was released a little less than a month after Yule suffered a fatal heart attack.

Films
 Bringing Up Father (1946)
 Jiggs and Maggie in Society (1947)
 Jiggs and Maggie in Court (1948)
 Jiggs and Maggie in Jackpot Jitters (1949)
 Jiggs and Maggie Out West (1950)

References

Bibliography
 Drew, Bernard. Motion Picture Series and Sequels: A Reference Guide. Routledge, 2013.

American film series
Bringing Up Father
Comedy film characters
Films based on American comics
Films based on comic strips
Live-action films based on comics
Monogram Pictures films